The following outline is provided as an overview of and introduction to law enforcement:

Law enforcement – subsystem of society that promotes adherence to the law by discovering and punishing persons who violate rules and norms governing that society. Although the term may encompass entities such as courts and prisons, it most frequently applies to those who directly engage in patrols or surveillance to dissuade and discover criminal activity, and those who investigate crimes and apprehend offenders.

Essence of law enforcement 
 The Thin Blue Line
 Criminal law
 Coming into force
 Unenforced law
 Law enforcement agency
 Law enforcement jargon
 Law enforcement officer

Disciplines 
 Criminology
 Forensic science
 Penology

Basis of law enforcement 

The reasons law enforcement exists:
 Crime – breaking the law. Without crime, there would be little need for law enforcement.
 Law and order (politics)
 Criminal law
 Criminal justice

Law enforcement agencies 

Law enforcement agency (list) –  government agency responsible for enforcement of laws. Outside North America, such organizations are called police services. In North America, some of these services are called police while some have other names (e.g. sheriff's office/department; investigative police services in the United States are often called bureaus (e.g. FBI, USMS, ICE, CBP, ATF, DEA, USSS etc.).
 Law enforcement agency powers
 Types of law enforcement agencies
 Police
 Federal police
 Military police
 Police department
 Private police
 Secret police
 State police
 Specialist law enforcement agency

Law enforcement officers 

 Constable
 Corrections 
 Detective
 Marshal and Deputy Marshal
 Private investigator
 Peace officer
 Police officer
 Park ranger
 Sheriff, Undersheriff, and Deputy Sheriff
 Bounty hunter
 Special agent
 Trooper
 Inspector

Law enforcement by region 

 Law enforcement by country
 List of countries and dependencies by number of police officers

History of law enforcement 

History of law enforcement 
 History of criminal justice
 Police box

Law enforcement equipment 

 Armor
 Ballistic vest
 Shield
 Ballistic shield
 Riot shield
 Police dog
 Police duty belt
 Police radio
 Police vehicle
 Policeware
 Police psychology
 Weapons
 Club
 Taser
 Firearm
 Handgun
 Riot gun
 Uniform
 Uniforms and equipment of the British police

Law enforcement techniques and procedures 

 Baton charge
 Body cavity search
 Crime analysis
 Crime displacement
 Crime mapping
 Criminal intelligence
 Crowd control
 Deadly force
 Defendo
 Dignitary Protection
 Door breaching
 Double tap
 Dragnet
 Forcible entry
 Immediate Action Rapid Deployment
 Lawful interception
 Mail cover
 Mozambique Drill
 Pain compliance
 Police psychology
 Riot control
 Rough ride
 Search of persons
 Sobriety checkpoints
 Speed trap
 Traffic break
 Tueller Drill
 Whisper stop

Criminal investigation 

Criminal Investigation – applied science involving the study of facts, used to identify, locate and prove the guilt of a criminal. Modern-day criminal investigations commonly employ many scientific techniques known collectively as forensic science.

 Bait car
 Computer forensics
 Dawn raid
 Facial composite
 FBI method of profiling
 Hunting strategy
 Indictment
 Interrogation
 Manhunt
 Mug shot
 Offender profiling
 Police diving
 Police lineup
 Re-creation
 Search and seizure
 Stakeout
 Sting operation
 Strip search
 Surveillance
 Telephone tapping
 Vehicular accident reconstruction
 Warrant

Components of a crime 

 Criminal – person who committed a crime
 Evidence
 Forensic science
 Suspect
 Victim

Law enforcement training 

 Police academy
 Police training officer
 Tactical Mindset
 Identifying threat
 Threat prevention
 Critical Thinking for the Police Officer
 Decision Making Process

Law enforcement issues 

 Law enforcement and society
 Police accountability
 Police brutality
 Police corruption
 Public security
 Vigilantism

Law enforcement organizations 

 Law enforcement organization

Law enforcement leaders and scholars 

 Julian Fantino
 J. Edgar Hoover
 Robert Peel
 Garda Síochána
 August Vollmer
 Buford Pusser
 Pahal Singh Lama
 Khadgajeet Baral
 Dil Bahadur Lama

See also 

 Outline of law
 Code enforcement
 List of intelligence agencies
 List of protective service agencies

References

External links 

 FBI page of law enforcement resources

Law enforcement
Law enforcement